Rachel Anne Sennott (born September 19, 1995) is an American actress and comedian. She is best known for her online comedy television series Ayo and Rachel Are Single with Ayo Edebiri and for starring roles in the films Shiva Baby (2020) and Bodies Bodies Bodies (2022).

Early life
Rachel Anne Sennott was born on September 19, 1995 in Simsbury, Connecticut, the daughter of Donna (Virzi) and Jack Sennott. She is of Italian and Irish descent, and was raised Catholic. She graduated from Simsbury High School in 2014.

Career

2016–2020: Early work in comedy
Sennott became interested in comedy as a freshman in college, when she went to an open mic night on a date. She studied acting at NYU Tisch and graduated in 2017. During college she continued to perform comedy at open mic nights, as well as acting in student films, including the lead role of Danielle in the 2017 short film version of Emma Seligman's Shiva Baby; she reprised this role in the 2020 feature film adaptation.

In 2018, feeling out of control of her fledgling career, she turned to Twitter comedy, writing short jokes and tweeting multiple in a day. She told Nylon that she did not enjoy the Manhattan open mic scene, feeling that people were laughing at her rather than with her, and quickly moved into the alt scene with a regular gig on It's A Guy Thing. She then developed her own shows in 2018, Puke Fest and Ur Gonna Slp Rlly Well Tonight. Puke Fest combines stand-up sets with a drinking game, and moved to Instagram Live during the COVID-19 pandemic. Her distinct comedic voice, a "messy" persona often complaining about dating and the economy, quickly became popular in the alt scene; in 2019, she was named one of the six best comedians of the alt scene on lists from both Time Out New York and Pop Dust, citing her unique satirical takes on aspects of millennial life and culture. She satirizes other elements of culture, with some of her most popular bits including a video about the LA movie culture and one about baby-obsessed young women. A sound clip from her LA video is sampled at the beginning of the song "Bump This" by Michael Medrano, Jake Germain, and Michete.

On television, Sennott has starred in HBO's High Maintenance, and played Jackie Raines on Call Your Mother. She has also developed Comedy Central series with Ayo Edebiri, and their shows Ayo and Rachel Are Single and Taking the Stage began airing on the network in 2020. She also appears with Edebiri and other comedians on the web comedy-documentary series Speak Up, seeking to amplify female voices about working in comedy.

2021–present: Transition to feature films
In film, she has starred in the 2020 feature films Tahara as Hannah Rosen, and Shiva Baby as Danielle. Both films are queer Jewish coming of age narratives set at funeral services, though Sennott is neither Jewish nor queer.  In the lead role of Danielle in Shiva Baby, which premiered at SXSW and TIFF in 2020, Sennott's performance was highlighted in several reviews, with Andrew Parker of The GATE saying that she gave "a wonderful, star making performance" and Alex de Vore of the Santa Fe Reporter writing that "after her performance in [the film], she should probably just be allowed to do whatever she wants – she's a natural." Sennott won the Rising Star award at the Philadelphia Jewish Film Festival. In 2022, she played Alice in Bodies Bodies Bodies, an A24 slasher film that also contained comedy and social satire. She was consistently named the standout performance of the film with Megan Conway of The New York Times Style Magazine summing up the consensus: "Sennott’s ability to inject an astonishing range of meaning into Alice’s various cries and yowls — as well as her litany of expletives and "oh my Gods" — steals the show."

In 2023, Sennott starred in the sex comedy film Bottoms, which she co-wrote with Shiva Baby’s Emma Seligman, and the comedy drama I Used To Be Funny. She is set to appear in Saverio Costanzo’s period drama Finalmente L’alba (Finally, Dawn Has Come). She will also appear in HBO’s The Idol.

Sennott was part of the popularization of front-facing camera comedy during COVID-19 pandemic quarantines, and coined the term "soft launching" relationships, social media vernacular that describes tagging new relationships on Instagram without explicitly announcing them. In June 2020 she took part in a livestream benefiting the Black Trans Travel Fund. She resides in Los Angeles and New York City.

Filmography

Awards and nominations

References

External links

Living people
1995 births
21st-century American actresses
21st-century American comedians
American film actresses
American people of Irish descent
American people of Italian descent
American stand-up comedians
American television actresses
American women comedians
Actresses from Connecticut
Catholics from Connecticut
Comedians from Connecticut
Internet humor
People from Simsbury, Connecticut
Tisch School of the Arts alumni
21st-century Roman Catholics